The Yuan Wang-class of tracking ships are used for tracking and support of satellite and intercontinental ballistic missiles by the People's Liberation Army Strategic Support Force of the People's Republic of China (PRC). It is important to note that the class is not a single class of identical design, but instead, a group of different designs grouped under the same series that share the same name.

Detailed specifications for every ship have not been released by the PLASSF. Their propulsion is from one Sulzer Ltd. diesel engine, with a top speed of 20 knots (37 km/h).

The class was first proposed by Premier Zhou Enlai in 1965, and the idea was personally approved by Mao Zedong in 1968. The first two ships of the class, Yuan Wang 1 and Yuan Wang 2, were built at the Jiangnan Shipyard in Shanghai and put to sea on 31 August 1977 and 1 September 1978 respectively. For the first time, this gave the PRC the ability to track launches and satellites that were not over their territory.

The first survey mission of the two ships was during May 1980. After being used for tracking of the launches of indigenously developed communications satellites, Yuan Wang 1 and Yuan Wang 2 underwent overhauls in 1986, so they could be used for supporting international satellite launches by the PRC.

Two further ships of the class have been built. The first was Yuan Wang 3, which was commissioned on 20 October 1995. The Yuan Wang 4 tracking ship was constructed by China State Shipbuilding Corporation and delivered to the China Satellite Launch and Tracking Control General on 18 July 1999. It had been converted from the previously used Xiang Yang Hong 10 scientific survey ship.

Another two Yuan Wang-class vessels were launched in Shanghai in early 2007.

Pictures of Yuan Wang 6 were published, and both Yuan Wang 5 and the newly commissioned ship were on duty for the Shenzhou 7 mission.

During the Shenzhou spacecraft flights, the four ships were positioned as follows:
Yuan Wang 1 in the Yellow Sea
Yuan Wang 2 about 1500 km (about 900 statute miles) southwest of French Polynesia
Yuan Wang 3 off the Namibian coast
Yuan Wang 4 off the coast of Western Australia in the Indian Ocean

Fleet list
 Yuan Wang 1 - 1977
 Yuan Wang 2 - 1978
 Yuan Wang 3 - 1995
 Yuan Wang 4 - 1999
 Yuan Wang 5 - 2007
 Yuan Wang 6 - 2007
 Yuan Wang 7 - 2016
 Yuan Wang 21 - Long March 5 transport ship
 Yuan Wang 22 - Long March 5 transport ship

Type 718

Type 718 tracking ship is the very first design of Yuanwang series, and it consists of two ships, Yuan Wang 1 and Yuan Wang 2, both of which have since retired in the early 2010s. Type 718 can attain speeds of 20 kn.

Yuan Wang 3
Yuan Wang 3 is the second generation tracking ship of Yuan Wang series, and it can attain speeds up to 20 kt, with a range of 18,000 nautical miles and a cruising speed of 18 kt.

Yuan Wang 4
Yuan Wang 4 was converted from Type 643 research vessel Xiangyanghong 10 (向阳红10), which was originally designed in February 1971, with construction begun in July 1975, and entered service in October 1979. Conversion was completed in August 1998, and the ship is capable of carrying a Changhe Z-8. Conversion work included more than four hundred projects in four major categories. Powered by 9000 hp diesel engines, Yuan Wang 4 has an endurance of 100 days and could reach a speed of up to 20 kn, with a range of 18,000 nautical miles cruising at 18 kn.

While in Jiangyin port at 5:10 AM on 5 August 2007, Yuan Wang 4 was hit by a coal carrier Harbor Sea 666 (Gang Hai 666, 港海 666), which caused a massive fire started at the point of collision at 4th fuel tank. The fire was put out after four hours without any casualties, but the equipment on board was severely damaged beyond repair. As a result, Yuan Wang 4 was subsequently converted to a target ship for DF-21 ballistic antiship missile to simulate an aircraft carrier target as it entered Jiangyin Shipyard on 15 April 2010 for repair, and eventually destroyed in the latter half of 2010.

Yuan Wang 5
Yuan Wang 5 is the third generation tracking ship of Yuan Wang series, and entered service on 29 September 2007. Loaded with electronic tracking gear, the Yuan Wang 5 has been called a "spy ship".

Built by Jiangnan Shipyard, Yuan Wang 5 has a displacement of 25,000 tones, and is designed to withstand winds up to Beaufort scale 12, and perform duties in sea state 6. It has a carrying capacity of 11,000 tons DWT and its draught is reported to be 8.2 meters. Its length overall (LOA) is 222 meters and its width is 25.2 meters. Its home port is Jiangyin on the Yangtze.

The general designer of both Yuan Wang 5 and 6 was Mr. Huang Wei (黄蔚), the general engineer of the 708th Institute of China Shipbuilding Industry Corporation (CSIC).

Yuan Wang 6

Yuan Wang 6, like its sister ship Yuan Wang 5, is also a third generation tracking ship of Yuan Wang series. Designed by the 708th Research Institute, construction begun in April 2006, and the ship was launched on March 16, 2007. The ship entered service on April 12, 2008, and become fully operational in July 2008.  Yuan Wang 6 utilizes fiber optic for its information system on board, and the electricity generated by the ship is enough to supply a city of 300,000. Specification:
Length (m): 222.2
Width (m): 25.2
Displacement (t): 24,966
Accommodation: 400

Yuan Wang 7

Yuan Wang 7 was constructed by Jiangnan Shipbuilding, and is said to be able to operate for 100 days at sea. The China Satellite Maritime Tracking and Control Department has said the vessel will be used for maritime tracking of the Shenzhou 11 manned space mission, and the Tiangong 2 space laboratory, using three large dish antennae some 10–12 meters in diameter. It was commissioned on 19 July 2016.
 Length (m): 220
 Width (m): tbc
 Height (m): 40m
 Displacement (t): 25,000

Yuan Wang 21
The Yuan Wang 21 is a cargo ship designed by the 708th Research Institute specially to transport rockets such as the Long March 5; construction began on 1 April 2012, and it was launched on 29 November 2012. Yuan Wang 21 entered service on 6 May 2013. Specification:
Length (m): 130
Width (m): 19
Draft (m): 5.8
Displacement (t): 9080

Yuan Wang 22
Yuan Wang 22 is also a cargo ship designed specially to transport rockets such as Long March 5, and it is also built by Jiangnan Shipyard, the same builder of earlier Yuan Wang 21. Yuan Wang 22 might be a sister ship of Yuan Wang 21, but this cannot be confirmed yet, because detailed information / specification of Yuan Wang 22 has not been released by official Chinese governmental sources yet (as of 2014). Yuan Wang 22 was launched on 24 January 2013.

See also
A list of similar ships:

French Navy 
 , 1990–present

Indian Navy 
 INS Dhruv, 2020–present

Soviet Navy / Russian Navy 
 Kosmonavt Vladimir Komarov, 1967–1989
 Akademik Sergei Korolev, 1970–1996
 Kosmonavt Yuri Gagarin, 1971–1991

United States Navy
 USNS Range Tracker (T-AGM-1) 1961-1969
 USNS Range Recoverer (T-AGM-2) 1960-1972
 USNS Longview (T-AGM-3) 1960-?
 USNS Richfield (T-AGM-4) 1960-1968
 USNS Sunnyvale (T-AGM-5) 1960-1974
 USNS Watertown (T-AGM-6) 1960-1971
 USNS Huntsville (T-AGM-7) 1960-1974
 USNS Wheeling (T-AGM-8) 1962-1990
 USNS General H. H. Arnold (T-AGM-9)
 USNS General Hoyt S. Vandenberg (T-AGM-10) 1964-1999
 USNS Twin Falls (T-AGM-11) 1960-1969
 USNS American Mariner (T-AGM-12) 1959-1964
 USNS Sword Knot (T-AGM-13) 1964-1972?
 USNS Rose Knot (T-AGM-14) 1964-1969
 USNS Coastal Sentry (T-AGM-15)
 USNS Coastal Crusader (T-AGM-16)  1964-1977
 USNS Timber Hitch (T-AGM-17) 1967-1979
 USNS Sampan Hitch (T-AGM-18) 1964-1973
 USNS Vanguard (T-AGM-19)
 USNS Redstone (T-AGM-20) 1964-1993
 USNS Mercury (T‑AGM‑21) 1964-1974?
 USNS Range Sentinel (T-AGM-22)
 USNS Observation Island (T-AGM-23) 1977–2014
 USNS Invincible (T-AGM-24) 2000–present
 USNS Howard O. Lorenzen (T-AGM-25) 2014-present

References

External links

 Global Security
 SinoDefence.com

Auxiliary ships of the People's Republic of China
Maritime vessels related to spaceflight